The 1947 Doncaster rail crash was a fatal rail incident that occurred just south of Doncaster station at Bridge Junction. A train was signalled onto an occupied line and the ensuing collision resulted in 18 deaths and 188 injuries. Both trains and signalling were operated by the London & North Eastern Railway (LNER).

Accident
At 4:41 pm on 9 August 1947, the 1:25 pm King's Cross to Leeds train (14 coaches) ran into the back of the 1:10 pm King's Cross to Leeds train (12 coaches) between Balby Junction signal box and Bridge Junction. The last three coaches of the first train were almost completely destroyed by the (estimated)  crash when the leading locomotive of the 1:25 pm, a Gresley V2, crashed into the rear of the preceding train. 700 people were aboard the two trains with casualties amounting to 18 dead and 188 injured (51 were taken to hospital). Local people came to assist where they could, and their efforts were acknowledged by the LNER.

Cause
The first train had been brought to a stand at a red signal near to Bridge Junction, and was just starting away when the collision occurred. The second train was incorrectly signalled into the section, resulting in a rear-end collision. Traffic had been described as "heavy for a Saturday, but not excessive".

References

Sources

External links
British Pathe news report of the crash (video file)

Derailments in England
Railway accidents and incidents in Yorkshire
Doncaster rail crash
Doncaster rail crash
Doncaster rail crash
Rail transport in Doncaster
Rail transport in South Yorkshire
History of South Yorkshire
Accidents and incidents involving London and North Eastern Railway
Doncaster rail crash, 1947
Doncaster rail crash
Railway accidents caused by signaller's error